Drop the Dip, later known as Trip to the Moon, was a wooden roller coaster that operated at several locations in Coney Island, Brooklyn, New York, in the early 20th century. The coaster is considered by some to be the first truly high-speed roller coaster.

Design
While innovative in its design, Drop the Dip was also noteworthy for how this design came about. A carpenter by the name of Christopher Feucht supposedly saw a toy model of a roller coaster in the office of his dentist, Welcome Mosley. Feucht was intrigued by the exaggerated hills and turns of Mosley's model coaster and asked Mosley to partner with him in designing and building a similar roller coaster in full scale.

Several authors have argued that the "extreme" elements in Drop the Dip represented an important shift away from a more sedate approach to earlier roller coaster design. The coaster was also the first to feature lap bars. Mental Floss listed the coaster as one of the "10 Roller Coasters that Changed America".

History
The coaster opened on June 6, 1907 in the Bowery area of Coney Island to significant success. It operated for only a little more than a month, however, before it was destroyed by the 1907 Steeplechase Park fire. Soon after it was destroyed, Feucht rebuilt the coaster in even more extreme form. The coaster was also moved several times after the fire. It was moved across the street during the 1910s (in 24 hours) to acquire better rent values and then was moved once more to Luna Park in 1924 (then changing its name to Trip to the Moon) Throughout the years and moves, Feucht continued to make adjustments and improvements to the coaster. He also worked sometimes as a ride operator. The ride was popular at Coney Island and earned around $20,000 a year on a ticket price of 25 cents.

Layout
In addition to its extreme drops and high speeds, Drop the Dip had a relatively compact footprint and short ride.

References

Coney Island
Demolished buildings and structures in Brooklyn
Former roller coasters in New York (state)